Digital physics is a speculative idea that the universe can be conceived of as a vast, digital computation device, or as the output of a deterministic or probabilistic computer program. The hypothesis that the universe is a digital computer was proposed by Konrad Zuse in his 1969 book Rechnender Raum ("Calculating Space"). The term digital physics was coined by Edward Fredkin in 1978, who later came to prefer the term digital philosophy. Fredkin encouraged the creation of a digital physics group at what was then MIT's Laboratory for Computer Science, with Tommaso Toffoli and Norman Margolus as primary figures.

Digital physics suggests that there exists, at least in principle, a program for a universal computer that computes the evolution of the universe. The computer could be, for example, a huge cellular automaton. 

Extant models of digital physics are incompatible with the existence of several continuous characters of physical symmetries, e.g., rotational symmetry, translational symmetry, Lorentz symmetry, and the Lie group gauge invariance of Yang–Mills theories, all central to current physical theory. Moreover, extant models of digital physics violate various well-established features of quantum physics, belonging to the class of theories with local hidden variables that have so far been ruled out experimentally using Bell's theorem.

However, covariant discrete theories can be formulated that preserve the aforementioned symmetries.

See also
 Mathematical universe hypothesis
 It from bit
 Simulation hypothesis
 Weyl's tile argument

References

Further reading
 Robert Wright, "Did the Universe Just Happen?", Atlantic Monthly, April 1988 - Article discussing Fredkin and his digital physics ideas

Theory of computation